Bromocresol green (BCG) is a dye of the triphenylmethane family (triarylmethane dyes). It belongs to a class of dyes called sulfonephthaleins. It is used as a pH indicator in applications such as growth mediums for microorganisms and titrations. In clinical practise, it is commonly used as a diagnostic technique. The most common use of bromocresol green is to measure serum albumin concentration within mammalian blood samples in possible cases of kidney failure and liver disease.

Properties
In aqueous solution, bromocresol green will ionize to give the monoanionic form (yellow), that further deprotonates at higher pH to give the dianionic form (blue), which is stabilized by resonance:

The acid dissociation constant (pKa) of this reaction is 4.8. Tap water is sufficiently basic to give a solution of bromocresol green its characteristic blue-green color.

The acid and basic forms of this dye have an isosbestic point in their UV-Visible spectrum, around 515 nm, indicate that the two forms interconvert directly without forming any other substance.

An ethanol solution (0.04 wt%) of bromocresol green has been proposed for TLC staining and is suitable for visualisation of the compounds with functional groups whose pKa is below 5.0 (carboxylic acids, sulfonic acids, etc.). These appear as yellow spots on a light or dark blue background; no heating is necessary. Bromophenol blue solution can be used for the same purpose.

The compound is synthesized by bromination of cresol purple (m-cresolsulfonphthalein).

Uses
It is used as a pH indicator and as a tracking dye for DNA agarose gel electrophoresis. It can be used in its free acid form (light brown solid), or as a sodium salt (dark green solid). It is also an inhibitor of the prostaglandin E2 transport protein. Additional applications include use in sol-gel matrices, the detection of ammonia, and the measurement of albumin in human plasma and serum.

Safety
Bromocresol green may cause irritation. Skin and eye contact should be avoided.

References

PH indicators
Triarylmethane dyes
Phenol dyes
Bromoarenes
Benzoxathioles